Bcachefs is a copy-on-write (COW) file system for Linux-based operating systems. Its primary developer, Kent Overstreet, first announced it in 2015, and efforts are ongoing to have it included in the mainline Linux kernel. It is intended to compete with the modern features of ZFS or Btrfs, and the speed and performance of ext4 or XFS.

Features
Bcachefs is a copy-on-write (COW) file system for Linux-based operating systems. Planned or existing features for Bcachefs include caching, full file-system encryption using the ChaCha20 and Poly1305 algorithms, native compression via zlib, LZ4, and Zstandard, snapshots, CRC-32C and 64-bit checksumming. It can use multiple block devices, including in RAID configurations. Bcachefs provides all the functionality of Bcache, a block-layer cache system for Linux, with which Bcachefs shares about 80% of its code.

History
Primary development has been by Kent Overstreet, the developer of Bcache, which he describes as a "prototype" for the ideas that became Bcachefs. Overstreet intends Bcachefs to replace Bcache. Overstreet has stated that development of Bcachefs began as Bcache's developers realized that its codebase had "been evolving ... into a full blown, general-purpose POSIX filesystem", and that "there was a really clean and elegant design" within it if they took it in that direction. Some time after Bcache was merged in 2013 into the mainline Linux kernel, Overstreet left his job at Google to work full-time on Bcachefs.

After a few years' unfunded development, Overstreet announced Bcachefs in 2015, at which point he called the code "more or less feature complete", and called for testers and contributors. He intended it to be an advanced file system with modern features like those of ZFS or Btrfs, with the speed and performance of file systems such as ext4 and XFS. As of 2017 Overstreet was receiving financial support for the development of Bcachefs via Patreon.

As of mid-2018, the on-disk format had settled. Patches had been submitted for review to have Bcachefs included in the mainline Linux kernel, but had not yet been accepted.

By mid-2019, the desired features of Bcachefs had reached and associated patches to LKML was submitted for peer review. As of February 2023, Bcachefs has still not been merged into the mainline Linux kernel.

References

Works cited

External links
 

2015 software
Compression file systems
File systems supported by the Linux kernel
Linux file system-related software